Hiresindhogi also spelled as Hire Sindhogi is a village in the Koppal taluk of Koppal district in the Indian state of Karnataka. Hiresindhogi is located South to District Headquarters Koppal and is 12 km from Koppal city.

Importance
Coins belonging to ancient era have been excavated in Hiresindhogi.

Demographics
As of 2001 India census, Hiresindhogi had a population of 3,624 with 1,814 males and 1,810 females and 677 Households.

See also
Gangavathi
Irakalgada
Kushtagi
Hospet
Koppal

References

External links
www.koppal.nic.in

Villages in Koppal district